Dino Rešidbegović (born 14 December 1975 in Sarajevo) is a Bosnian contemporary classical music and electronic/electroacoustic music composer.

Education

Dr. Dino Rešidbegović was born in Sarajevo, SFR Yugoslavia (today Bosnia and Herzegovina) on 14 December 1975 and received his musical training on piano at the elementary and secondary music school there. After moving to Vienna in 1994, he studied music composition (gradual and master programme), at the Universität für Musik und Darstellende Kunst in Wien (University of Music and Performing Arts, Vienna) and at the Konservatorium Wien (Privat Univarsität der Stadt Wien) - Musik und Kunst Privatuniversität der Stadt Wien, with professors Heinz Karl Gruber, Wolfgang Liebhart and Rainer Bischof. He graduated (magna cum laude). He studied piano with professor Kim Oak Hyun at Konservatorium Wien and also graduated in 2003. He continued postgraduate (post master) study of composition at the Universität für Musik und Darstellende Kunst in Wien with professor Detlev Müller-Siemens and graduated with the highest score in 2005. At the same institution, he also studied conducting with professor Uroš Lajović.

He completed his Doctor of Musical Arts degree in musical composition (DMA) with the highest score at Sarajevo Music Academy with professors Dr. Igor Karača (Oklahoma State University–Stillwater, United States), composition and Dr. Ivan Čavlović (Sarajevo Music Academy), dissertation.

He was also taking classes with Claus Ganter and workshops with Luca Lombardi and Stefan Fricke.

Awards

He won awards at composition competitions such as: 
Alban Berg Stiftung (Alban Berg Society) (2001) 
Alban Berg Stiftung (Alban Berg Society) (2002)
Theodor Körner Prize (2003)
Siemens AG Österreich prize (2004)
Siemens AG Österreich prize (2005)

Cooperation and performances

He is also active in composition and performance of his music, and has developed new movements in music education programmes, with the assistance of his team of musicians such as Omer Blentić, Dragan Opančić, Ivan Šarić, Hanan Hadžajlić, Davor Maraus, Gilles Grimaître, Katharina Bleier, Elena Gabbrielli and others.
Composer and pianist Jürg Wyttenbach, conducted Residbegovic's composition "The impact of analog synthesizer" for ensemble in Sarajevo, in 2015.

His works were performed with conductors such as: Obrad Nedeljković, Dario Vučić, Josip Nalis, Jaime Wolfson, Emir Mejremić and Samra Gulamović.

Residbegovic's "Three orchestral miniatures" are part of the regular repertoire of Azis Sadikovic.

His works were also performed by orchestras/ensembles such as Sarajevo Philharmonic Orchestra, Belgrade String Orchestra "Dušan Skovran", Ensemble Proton Bern, Pons Artis Ensemble, Austrian Art Ensemble, Sonemus, Trio Magis, Platypus in Italy, Croatia, Slovenia, Serbia, Germany, Japan, Bosnia and Herzegovina, Switzerland, Austria, and USA (including Carnegie Hall).

He is a permanent member of the Austrian Composers Society (ÖKB). He is a co-founder and active member of the INSAM Institute for Contemporary Artistic Music.

Film score

The Third movement from his "Piano Concerto" (No.1) was used as a soundtrack in the feature film Cameraperson (2016) by Kirsten Johnson.

Academic career

Rešidbegović is associate professor of Music Composition, Electronic/Electroacoustic music and Polyphony at Sarajevo Music Academy of the University of Sarajevo, department of music composition.

Style

Reductional music complexity RMC

Rešidbegović formed a new wave of 21st-century classical music, known as Reductional music complexity, a term dating from 2003, based on a new order of parameters and their categorization by the composer. Another description of his style is "rhythmical music" which came from his categorizations of rhythm, or corpse of the music. Inspired by musicians such as John Cage, Mauricio Kagel, Karlheinz Stockhausen, Hans-Joachim Hespos and his professors Rainer Bischof and Detlev Müller-Siemens, he started to write music without tone pitches and established many compositional techniques of "reductional complexity". Musical parameters such as rhythm, dynamics, his own expression marks and description, extended techniques of many instruments are the base of his music, usually written with graphic notation.

Piano extended techniques

Rešidbegović developed a number of instrumental techniques, such as his piano extended techniques and treatment of piano strings and resonator of the instrument such as the use of synthesizers in contemporary classical music.

Approximate Reductionist Graphical Notation ARGN

Rešidbegović determined his notation for electronic and acoustic instruments in his dissertation, "Subtractive synthesis in composition" as "Approximate Reductionist Graphical Notation".

Selective compositions

Experimental, music painting, aleatoric, music theater 

"X O" Free choice: Any Instrument.
"Chelovek" for bass, Computer generated sound by Google Translate. Composition "Recitativo Chelovek" is the first music composition which includes Google Translate as a musical instrument.
"3X" for two piano players and deconstructed drum-set.

Electronic and electroacoustic music

"Subtractive study for sound synthesizers and ensemble" for amplified flute, amplified alto saxophone, amplified violin, amplified cello, electric guitar, synthesizers (DSI Prophet 12, DSI Pro 2, Moog Sub 37 and Make Noise CV Bus Shared System with Tempi, Erbe-Verb and MMG) and amplified piano.
"X O part II" for amplified flute, amplified cello, analog modular sound synthesizers (Make Noise CV Bus Shared System with Tempi, Erbe-Verb and MMG, Moog Sub 37 and Analog Rytm - rhythm computer). 
"WreeskyIII" for solo flute with processors. (Boss VE-20 and MF-108M Cluster Flux).

Visiting speech therapist (cycle of 4 etudes for amplified piano)
"Pedal étude"
"Percussion étude"
"Tapping étude"
"Vocal etude"

Chamber

"For Sonemus" for flute, clarinet, violin and piano.
"Mechanicus (Heron from Alexandria)" for flute, violin and piano.
"The impact of the analog synthesizer" for mezzo-soprano, flute, cello, accordion and piano.
"R N" for flute, clarinet and French horn.

Vocal

The Wilderness (cycle of three songs for bass and piano)

"Underwaterfall"
"New York Maidens" 
"Fear"

Homo Sapiens (cycle of three songs for soprano and piano)
"Flee for your lives"
"Ethnic cleansing"
"Refugees"

Big band

"Mad Haus" for Big Band orchestra.

Orchestra

"Piano concerto No.1" for piano and orchestra.
"Bak study for piano and orchestra" for amplified piano and orchestra.

References

External links

Samson, Jim. Music in the Balkans, Boston, BRILL, 2013. p. 564.  
Čavlović, Ivan. Historija muzike u Bosni i Hercegovini, Sarajevo, Muzička akademija, 2011. 
Rešidbegović, Dino Subtractive Study for Sound Synthesizers and Ensemble, Saarbrücken, LAP LAMBERT Academic Publishing, 2017 
Hadžajlić, Hanan. Od Zvuka (Intervju s kompozitorom: Dino Rešidbegović), Sarajevo, Hanan Hadžajlić / Kreuzlingen, Musica Neo, 2016. ID: SM-000263341
Hadžajlić, Hanan. Komparacija interpretacijskih analiza kompozicije 'X O pt. II' Dine Rešidbegovića, za flautu/bas flautu i procesore, ozvučeno violončelo, ozvučeni klavir, analogne sintetizatore zvuka i ritam mašinu, Sarajevo, INSAM / Kreuzlingen, Musica Neo, 2017. ID: SM-000291837

1975 births
Living people
Bosnia and Herzegovina composers
21st-century classical composers
University of Music and Performing Arts Vienna alumni
Musicians from Sarajevo
Bosnia and Herzegovina film score composers
Bosnia and Herzegovina electronic musicians
Experimental musicians
Experimental composers
21st-century classical musicians
Contemporary classical composers
Bosniaks of Bosnia and Herzegovina
Theodor Körner Prize recipients
Academic staff of the University of Sarajevo